The Revue Européenne des Migrations Internationales (REMI) is a multidisciplinary peer-reviewed academic journal published by the University of Poitiers with a support of the CNRS.

Publication and distribution 
Four issues are published each year. They can be freely accessed via the OpenEdition Journals platform after a one-year embargo period. The main publication languages of the REMI are French and English, the abstracts are also available in Spanish. The issues prior to 2002 are available via Persée. The latest issues are distributed via Cairn.info and Cairn International where they can be accessed with a subscription or purchased separately.

History 
The Revue Européenne des Migrations Internationales is the first and oldest francophone journal of Migration studies. It was founded in 1985 by Gildas Simon (University of Poitiers/CNRS), in order to disseminate the results of the research on international migration and interethnic relations, promote the new research topics and subjects, and contribute to the scientific collaboration between European researchers and institutions. The creation of the REMI, along with the Migrinter research laboratory, constituted a milestone in International Migration studies. In particular, it contributed to the popularization of the concept of transnationalism in France. It can also be considered as one of the main Western journals dealing with Arab/African Migration studies.

Initially published three times a year, the REMI became a quarterly journal in 2012. Its actual cover and layout date from 2016, when the colour illustrations appeared and the number of articles in English increased. Among other databases, it is covered by IBSS, Index Islamicus and ERIH PLUS. Since 2021, the REMI is published only in electronic format.

Editors-in-chief 
(University of Poitiers/CNRS, if not specified)

1985–1992: Gildas Simon

1993–1994: Gildas Simon and Michelle Guillon

1994–1999: Michelle Guillon

2000–2006: Michelle Guillon and Marie-Antoinette Hily

2007–2010: Marie-Antoinette Hily

2010–2014: Marie-Antoinette Hily and William Berthomière

2014–2015: William Berthomière and Véronique Petit

2016–2018: Véronique Petit and 

2018–2022: Olivier Clochard and Camille Schmoll (EHESS)

2022-present: Olivier Clochard, Constance De Gourcy (Mesopolhis) and Yann Scioldo-Zürcher (CRH)

References 

Academic journals associated with international learned and professional societies of Europe
French-language journals
Human migration
University of Poitiers